Wolfram Burgard (born 1961 in Gelsenkirchen, Germany) is a German roboticist. He is a full professor at the Albert-Ludwigs-Universität Freiburg where he heads the Laboratory for Autonomous Intelligent Systems. He is known for his substantial contributions to the simultaneous localization and mapping (SLAM) problem as well as diverse other contributions to robotics.

Biography

Education

Wolfram Burgard received his Diploma degree from University of Dortmund in 1987 and his Doctorate from the University of Bonn in 1991. His thesis advisor was Armin B. Cremers.

Career

In 1991 he became a research assistant at the University of Bonn, where he led the laboratory for Autonomous Mobile Systems. He was head of the research group which installed the mobile robot Rhino as the first interactive museum tour-guide robot in the Deutsches Museum Bonn, Germany in 1997. In 1998, he and his colleagues deployed the mobile robot Minerva in the National Museum of American History in Washington DC. In 1999, Wolfram Burgard became Professor for Autonomous Intelligent Systems at the Albert-Ludwigs-Universität Freiburg.

Research

Together with his colleagues, Wolfram Burgard developed numerous probabilistic approaches to mobile robot navigation. This includes Markov localization, a probabilistic approach to mobile localization which can robustly track the position of a mobile robot, estimate its global position when it starts without any prior knowledge about it, and can even recover from localization failures. In 1999, Frank Dellaert, Dieter Fox, Sebastian Thrun, and Wolfram Burgard developed Monte Carlo localization, a probabilistic approach to mobile robot localization that is based on particle filters.

Wolfram Burgard and his group has also made substantial contributions to the simultaneous localization and mapping (SLAM) problem, which is to determine the map of the environment and the position of the robot at the same time.

Wolfram Burgard together with his long-term collaborators Dieter Fox and Sebastian Thrun is a co-author of the book Probabilistic Robotics.
He also is a co-author of the book Principles of Robot Motion - Theory, Algorithms, and Implementations, together with
Howie Choset, Kevin M. Lynch, Seth A. Hutchinson, George Kantor, Lydia E. Kavraki and Sebastian Thrun.

Wolfram Burgard has the 2009 Gottfried Wilhelm Leibniz Prize, the most prestigious German research prize. He has furthermore received seven best paper awards from outstanding conferences. He also became a distinguished lecturer of the IEEE Robotics and Automation Society.

In 2008, Wolfram Burgard became a fellow of the European Coordinating Committee for Artificial Intelligence. In 2009, Wolfram Burgard became fellow of the Association for the Advancement of Artificial Intelligence. In 2010, he  received an Advanced Grant of the European Research Council.

Students
Wolfram Burgard supervised several PhD students in his lab for Autonomous Intelligent Systems, namely
Maren Bennewitz (2004), Dirk Haehnel (2005), Cyrill Stachniss (2006), Rudolph Triebel (2007), Óscar Martínez Mozos (2008), Patrick Pfaff (2008), and Christian Plagemann (2008), Jürgen Sturm (2011), Daniel Meyer-Delius Di Vasto (2011), Slawomir Grzonka (2011), Thilo Grundmann (2012), Kai Wurm (2012), Axel Rottmann (2012), Barbara Frank (2013), Rainer Kümmerle (2013), Bastian Steder (2013), Jörg Müller (2013), Dominik Joho (2013), Boris Lau (2013), Maximilian Beinhofer (2014).

A large fraction of his publications are available at Google Scholar.

References

External links
 Wolfram Burgard's home page
 Wolfram Burgard's research group

1961 births
Living people
German computer scientists
German roboticists
Artificial intelligence researchers
Technical University of Dortmund alumni
University of Bonn alumni
Academic staff of the University of Freiburg
Fellows of the Association for the Advancement of Artificial Intelligence
Gottfried Wilhelm Leibniz Prize winners
Fellows of the European Association for Artificial Intelligence